Neish is a name of Scottish origin.  Clan Neish (or MacNeish) is a sept of either Clan Gregor or Clan Innes.

People with the name
Arthur Charles Neish, late Canadian plant biologist and Fellow of the Royal Society of London
Bruce Neish, former Australian rules footballer
Clan Neish*

Places with the name
Neish Island

See also
McNeish
MacNeish

Scottish surnames
Scottish Gaelic-language surnames